The third series of the British television drama series Ackley Bridge began broadcasting on 18 June 2019 on Channel 4, and ended on 6 August 2019. The series follows the lives of the staff and pupils at the fictional multi-cultural academy school Ackley Bridge College, in the fictitious Yorkshire mill town of Ackley Bridge. It consists of eight sixty-minute episodes.

Production and casting
Production and filming on the series began in January 2019 in Halifax, West Yorkshire. In November 2018, Ackley Bridge put out an open casting for boys aged 15 to 18 of Polish ethnicity. In January 2019, the castings of Charlie Hardwick and Rob James-Collier were announced; Hardwick was cast as Sue Carp, director of pupil behaviour, whilst James-Collier was cast as the new deputy headteacher and Emma Keane's (Liz White) replacement as an English teacher, Martin Evershed. Hardwick said she is "absolutely over the moon to be joining" the show, complimenting the "fantastic characters and brilliantly-sharp storytelling." Hardwick describes Sue as "belligerent and unwilling" and who is "solely concerned with counting down the next ten years to her retirement" rather than the welfare of the students. James-Collier said he is "thrilled" of his casting and called the young actors "fearless and talented." Upon completion of filming, Mountview graduates Hareet Deol and Adrian Nik were revealed to have joined the cast; Deol portrays new PE teacher Hassan Hussein, whilst Nik was cast as Yusef Ibrahim. The additions of George Potts, as Mandy's new "nightmare" boss Ken Weaver, and Phoebe Tuffs-Berry, as Year 10 "bad girl" Rukhsana, were announced shortly before the trailer's release. Natalie Gavin was later revealed to be playing Sam's "formidable" mum, fresh out of prison, Nadine Murgatroyd. In the third episode of the series, Ty Glaser was introduced as the stand-in headteacher, Sian Oakes.

Cast

Main

Featured
Poppy Lee Friar as Missy Booth
Liz White as Emma Keane

Recurring

Guest

Episodes

Notes

References

2019 British television seasons
Series 3